San Jose, officially the Municipality of San Jose (Surigaonon: Lungsod nan San Jose;), is a 4th class municipality and capital of the province of Dinagat Islands, Philippines. According to the 2020 census, it has a population of 26,375 people.

San Jose is the seat of the Philippine Benevolent Missionaries Association (PBMA).

History
The Municipality of San Jose was named in honor of Jose Ecleo who was its pioneer and the father of the late renowned mayor of the Municipality of Dinagat.

It was once a part of the municipality of Dinagat. Even then, San Jose has been significantly progressive compared with the Poblacion until its creation as a municipality on November 15, 1989, by virtue of Republic Act No. 6769 authored by Glenda B. Ecleo, during the time of President Corazon C. Aquino. The creation was amended on December 20, 2009, an act to amend Section 1 of the above-mentioned Republic Act through Republic Act 9859 covering an area of 3,422 hectares. It was within its jurisdiction twelve (12) barangays namely; San Jose, Matingbe, Aurelio, Jacquez, San Juan, Mahayahay, Don Ruben, Justiniana Edera, Santa Cruz, Cuarinta, Wilson and Luna.

San Jose has many roads, a commercial establishment, a concrete port, a college and other urban uses not common to rural communities.

Geography

Barangays
San Jose is politically subdivided into 12 barangays.
 Aurelio
 Cuarinta
 Don Ruben Ecleo
 Jacquez
 Justiniana Edera
 Luna
 Mahayahay
 Matingbe
 San Jose (Poblacion)
 San Juan
 Santa Cruz
 Wilson

Climate

Demographics

Economy

References

External links
   San Jose Profile at the DTI Cities and Municipalities Competitive Index
 [ Philippine Standard Geographic Code]

Municipalities of Dinagat Islands
Provincial capitals of the Philippines